The Canon F-1 is a 35 mm single-lens reflex camera produced by Canon of Japan from March 1971 until the end of 1981, at which point it had been superseded by the New F-1 launched earlier that year. The Canon FD lens mount was introduced along with the F-1, but the previous Canon FL-mount lenses and older R- series lenses were also compatible with the camera with some limitations. The Canon F-1 was marketed as a competitor to the Nikon F and Nikon F2 single lens reflex cameras by Nikon.

The F-1 was Canon's first successful professional-grade SLR system, supporting a huge variety of accessories and interchangeable parts so it could be adapted for different uses and preferences.  Their earlier professional Canonflex of 1959 had failed due to a premature introduction—before professional accessories were ready.

In 1972 Canon launched a Highspeed model with a fixed pellicle mirror that allowed the user to see the subject at all times. Equipped with a motor drive, the camera was able to shoot up to 9 frames per second—the highest speed of any motor driven camera at the time.

Lenses

The Canon F-1 uses the Canon FD lens mount, which was introduced alongside the camera. Between 1970 and 1979, a total of 68 different FD mount lens models were produced, ranging from 7.5mm to 800mm in focal length.

Most earlier FL and R series lenses are compatible with the F-1, though they must be used in stop-down metering mode. One exception is the FLP 38 mm F2.8, which was designed for the Canon Pellix. This lens' rear element extends further into the camera body than other FL-mount lenses, and would obstruct the moving mirror of the Canon F-1.

Canon introduced a number of innovations in the FD lens line, including the first use of an aspherical lens element in a 35mm camera system with the release of the FD 55mm f/1.2 AL in (launched alongside the F-1 in March 1971). Canon's super telephoto FD lenses were also the first to use white-colored housings, which were designed to keep the thermally sensitive fluorite lens elements from expanding or cracking. Canon continues to use white housings for its L-series lenses today, though the modern versions are made with ultra-low dispersion (UD) glass rather than fluorite.

Accessories

The Canon F-1 has one of the largest set of accessories of any 35mm SLR ever produced. The viewfinder is removable (interchangeable with four other viewfinders); The focusing screen can be changed out with 4 (later 9) types; the mirror can be locked up to allow deep seated lenses or for high magnification work, the back is interchangeable with a data and bulk film back (250 exposures), The bottom plate is removable and there are 4 Motor Drives and / or Power Winders that can be used (one was a special order 9 frames per second high speed motor drive); three different flash couplers allowed a wide variety of flashes; the eyepiece can take threaded diopter adjustment lenses, magnifiers or angle finders; and the lens collection numbers over 50 FD (and a few special purpose) lenses from 7.5 mm fisheye to 1200 mm super telephoto, and includes the world's fastest 300 mm at the time (the 300 mm F2.8L) and the world's fastest 400 mm lens (the New FD 400 mm F2.8L) both of which incorporate special fluorite and ultra low dispersion glass elements for superb optical quality at the widest lens opening.

Viewfinders

Like most professional 35 mm cameras of the 1970s, the F-1 had interchangeable viewfinders. To remove the viewfinder, one depressed the two small buttons at the rear sides of the finder, and slid the finder toward the back of the camera (or depress one button on the bottom of the Speed Finder).

The camera shipped with a standard pentaprism finder, called an "eye-level finder" by Canon.

Other finders available included a waist-level finder, Speed Finder, Booster T finder, and Servo EE finder.

The waist-level finder was patterned after the design of waist-level finders common on medium format cameras. It had a pop-up hood to shield the focusing screen from stray light, as well as a magnifier to help with critical focusing. The waist-level finder did not allow the metering information to be seen.

The Speed Finder had a rotation feature. This had an arrangement of prisms such that it could be swivelled between eye-level and waist-level positions. It also allowed the entire finder image to be viewed from 60 millimeters away and was suggested for use when wearing goggles or anything else that could prevent the user from placing the eyepiece right up to their eye. It allowed full metering.

The Booster T Finder and Servo EE Finder were both essentially variations on the standard eye-level finder. The Booster T Finder contained an ultra-sensitive metering cell which could read as low as EV −3.5. Just like the metering range was shifted towards the dark side, this finder also shift the shutter speeds the camera provided towards the long end. Instead of the normal range (1 s – 1/2000 s), the Booster T Finder gave 60 s – 1/60 s. The shutter speed dial on the finder locked on to the camera's normal shutter dial and drove it through a coupling pin for the standard range of 1 s – 1/60 s. The finder also had a trigger button, which went through the finder down to the normal trigger button. When the Booster's shutter speed dial was turned further, towards longer times, the camera's dial stopped at the B(ulb) setting, and the finder kept the trigger button pressed for the duration of the exposure. The mechanics of this connection also resulted in the oddity that there was no 2 s setting, but 4, 3 and 1 seconds.

The Servo EE Finder added shutter priority automatic exposure to the F-1. A servo mechanism in the finder drove the aperture lever on the lens, stopping it down to the correct value. This finder used the same coupling pin on the shutter speed dial as the Booster T Finder did, to sync the finder's shutter speed setting with the camera. It required a cord connected battery magazine (8AAs) or the Motor Drive MF and a special power cord.

Motor drives

The originally available Motor Drive was named the "Motor Drive Unit". It was commonly referred to as the Motor Drive MD – because all of the accessories had MD in their suffix, but that was not the official designation. The Motor Drive Unit originally required a corded battery pack (10 AAs) making it unwieldy for field or sports action use. A later battery pack that direct connected to the unit became available. The unit also contained a built intervalometer for delays up to 1 frame per minute. The maximum speed was 3 frames per second.

In 1972 Canon made a special Modification of the F-1 called the "High Speed Motor Drive Camera". It had a fixed pellicle (semi transparent) mirror, the motor drive motors were a permanent attachment (the camera's wind lever was removed – making it impossible to use without the motor drive). Maximum speed was 9 frame/sec – the fastest available at the time.  Its use at the 1972 Olympics in Japan produced fantastic sequential shots that were previously impossible to achieve.

In 1973, Canon introduced the Motor Drive MF. The Motor Drive MF had its batteries (10 AAs) in a vertical grip that mounted to the front left (looking from the front). It had a maximum rate of 3.5 frame/sec and was much better suited to action / sports photography, especially when paired with the Speed Finder or Servo EE finder. A special cord allowed the Servo EE finder to draw its power from the Motor drive MF – thus making a much more compact setup than the original Motor Drive unit.  The Motor Drive MF did not have a built in intervalometer, but the Interval Timer L (and later the Interval Timer TM-1 (Quartz) could be plugged into the remote control socket as could remote switches and a wireless control unit, the Wireless Controller LC-1. These all allowed either remote and / or unattended use of the camera.

Later, Canon introduced the Power Winder F, a 2 frame/ sec power winder with a grip for ease of use. It used 4 AA batteries in the same battery magazine that the Canon A-series Power Winder A used. The Power winder F could use most of the remote switches that also fit the Motor Drive MF. The only two accessories that it could not use were the Interval Timer L and the Remote Switch 60-MF.  While not as fast, The Power Winder F was smaller and lighter than the Motor Drive MF.

Unlike many other professional-level cameras of the early 1970s, the F-1 required no modification or special custom fitting to attach the motor drives, one simply removed the bottom plate and screwed the motor drive in place.

Backs

The F-1's back was removable. A Data Back F (for the original F-1 and F-1n) or Data Back FN (for the New F-1) (which being mechanical is now incapable of putting the current year on a photo) or a bulk film back that could hold 250 exposures could be attached. The Film Chamber 250 could be used alone or with the Motor Drive Unit or Motor Drive MF (the MF's grip had to be removed and coupled via a dedicated cord).

Eyepiece

The F-1s eyepiece was threaded and could take a metal (later soft rubber covered) ring, an eyecup or several different diopter adjustment lenses. The Magnifier R and Angle Finders A2 and B could also be attached to allow critical focusing and / or waist-level use (if one did not want to fit either the Speed Finder or Waist Level Finder).

Flash accessories

With a removable viewfinder, the F-1's flash coupler originally attached atop the rewind crank. Initially, there were two flash couplers, D and L. The D model was a simple x-synch coupler that allowed any non-dedicated manual or auto flash to be used. The Flash Coupler L contained two batteries (now hard to find, one being originally a 1.35v mercuric oxide and the other being the uncommon PX-1 size), one which powered a light to light up the metering window visible in the viewfinder, and the other to work with the original Canon Auto tuning system (CATS). The CATS used a special auto flash, the SpeedLite 133D and Flash auto Rings A, B, A2 and B2 and Canon 50 mm and 35 mm Lenses which signalled through the cords the distance of the subject and the charge level of the flash to allow match needle flash photography.

Canon announced and produced manuals for a high power handle mounted ("pototao masher") flash designated SpeedLight 500A. This was also to use the CATS equipment It appears in some Canon publications, and there are user instructions for it, however most people have never actually seen a SpeedLight 500A.

For low ambient light photography without flash, Canon provided the Finder Illuminator F which slid over the same flash contacts at the flash couplers. It contained a small battery powered light to light up the metering window.

Later, Canon introduced the Flash Coupler F, which fastened over the Eye Level Finder, making the camera look like more like one with a fixed viewfinder and hot shoe. This flash coupler, obviously could not be used with any other viewfinder, and did not have the electronics that the L model had, but it was more compact and the newer A-series flashes which had auto flash capabilities had now superseded the old SpeedLite 133D.

The CATS flash equipment was for the later electronic Canon F1 New (1981) and it allowed aperture settings from the camera to be communicated to the flash unit. It was also possible for the flash unit to select an appropriate camera aperture based on its own photo cell exposure reading, provided that the motor drive was also present. The motor drive is necessary for the camera to function in shutter priority. TTL Flash was introduced on the Nikon F3 (1981) which was a direct competitor of the F1 New.  For many this was considered as a considerable advantage although the ergonomics of the  Nikon F3 with its liquid crystal display lacked the clarity of the Canon F1.

Macro, micro and close-up photography

A comprehensive set of close-up, macro and microphoto accessories was available for the F-1, including three bellows units, reversing rings and couplers, macro and micro photo hoods and couplers, copy stands, manual and automatic extension tubes and 3 different focal length macro lenses.

Revisions

In 1976, the camera was revised slightly. This revised version is sometimes called the F-1n (not to be confused with the 1981 New F-1). All told 13 improvements were made. These changes were:
 Change the standard focusing screen from the A style (microprism only) to E style (split image with microprism ring).
 Widen the film advance lever offset from 15 degrees to 30 degrees.
 Decrease the winding stroke from 180 degrees to 139 degrees.
 Increase the maximum ASA from 2000 to 3200.
 Added a plastic tip to the advance lever.
 Changed the mirror to transmit more blue light, thus making the image brighter.
 Added a detent to the rewind crank to allow it to stay put when pulled out.
 Added the capability to take a screw-in type PC sync socket.
 Spring load the battery check position of the power switch.
 Increase the size of the shutter release cup.
 Added a soft rubber ring around the eyepiece.
 Added a film reminder holder to the camera back.
 Simplify multiple exposure procedure.

The number of focusing screens was also expanded from four to nine.

In 1980 Canon introduced "Laser Matte" focusing screens identified by an "L" in a circle on the screen's label. These Laser Matte screens were noticeably brighter than the earlier screens, and they were continued with the New F-1.

Special editions
A special commemorative model of the F-1 was offered for the 1976 Montreal Olympics. It was identical to the regular F-1 but for the Olympic emblem on the front upper left of the body. Canon also manufactured and sold commemorative 55 mm and (much harder to find) 58 mm lens caps with the 1976 Montreal Olympics for their normal lenses in production at the time.

For the 1980 Winter Olympics in Lake Placid, a Special version of the F-1 with the engraved Lake Placid Olympic logo was offered. Special Lake Placid 52 mm lens caps were also made.

In 1978 a military model called "ODF-1" (olive drab) with an all-over olive green finishing was presented. (Note, this was not for military use but rather a special addition made for the civilian market. It's unknown how many were made, figures are estimated to be around 3 000.) 

Canon, being the official sponsor of the World Cup, made 1978 55 mm lens caps and 1982 52 mm lens caps commemorating the 1978 and 1982 World Cup events.

In popular culture 
The Museum of Contemporary Art in Gothenburg in Sweden, showed a giant working replica of the Canon F1 made by the artist Sonja Nilsson in 2001

References

External links 

 Canon Inc. Canon F-1.  Retrieved from Canon's online Camera Museum on October 21, 2005.

 Photography in Malaysia (1999). Classic Modern SLRs – Canon F-1, 1971.  Retrieved on October 21, 2005.
 Canon F-1 in olypedia.de (German)
 Special Models of Canon F-1 in olypedia.de (German)
 Canon ODF-1 Retrieved on November 26, 2015.
 "The Electro-Optic Camera - The world's first DSLR. Made by Eastman Kodak Company in 1987." by James McGarvey (English)

F-1
Cameras introduced in 1971